Logan High School is a public high school in Logan, Ohio, United States.  It is the only high school in the Logan-Hocking School District.

Athletics
The Logan Chieftains have been a member of the Southeastern Ohio Athletic League since 1925. The league will dissolve after the 2016–2017 school year.  Logan's sports teams will be independent of a league starting in June 2017.

Notable alumni
 J. B. Dollison - newspaper editor and politician.
 Katie Smith - professional basketball player and coach.
 Tyson Veidt - college football coach.

References

External links

 District Website

High schools in Hocking County, Ohio
Public high schools in Ohio